Asad Baig (born 26 November 1988) is a Pakistani cricketer. He made his first-class debut for Pakistan Customs in the 2009–10 Quaid-e-Azam Trophy on 10 October 2009.

References

External links
 

1988 births
Living people
Pakistani cricketers
Habib Bank Limited cricketers
Karachi Blues cricketers
Karachi Port Trust cricketers
Karachi Whites cricketers
Pakistan Customs cricketers
Place of birth missing (living people)